Eudontomyzon is a genus of lamprey in the family Petromyzontidae. Most species are found in Eastern Europe.

Species
There are currently seven recognized species in this genus:

 Eudontomyzon danfordi Regan, 1911 (Carpathian lamprey)
 Eudontomyzon graecus (Renaud & Economidis, 2010) (validity doubtful, may be junior synonym of E. hellenicus)
 Eudontomyzon hellenicus Vladykov, Renaud, Kott & Economidis, 1982 (Greek brook lamprey)
 Eudontomyzon mariae (L. S. Berg, 1931) (Ukrainian brook lamprey)
 Eudontomyzon morii L. S. Berg, 1931 (Korean lamprey)
 Eudontomyzon stankokaramani M. S. Karaman (sr), 1974 (Drin brook lamprey)
 Eudontomyzon vladykovi Oliva & Zanandrea, 1959 (Danubian brook lamprey)

An eighth possible undescribed species, the Ukrainian migratory lamprey, Eudontomyzon sp. nov. 'migratory', became extinct in the late 19th century.

References

 
Jawless fish genera
Taxa named by Charles Tate Regan
Taxonomy articles created by Polbot